Scott Thornton may refer to:
Scott Thornton (footballer), Australian rules footballer
Scott Thornton (ice hockey), ice hockey player